Dustin Majewski (born August 16, 1981) is an American former college and professional baseball outfielder.

College career
After earning 1999 Class 4A Player of the Year honors and leading Brenham High School to the Texas state championship finals, Majewski enrolled at Blinn College, where he twice earned All-Conference and All-Region honors in 2000 and 2001.

Majewski transferred to the University of Texas prior to the 2002 season. As a member of the 2002 Texas Longhorns baseball team, Majewski earned Third-Team All-American honors and 2002 College World Series All-Tournament Team honors while helping Texas to its fifth College World Series championship. Majewski was drafted by the Boston Red Sox in the 12th round of the 2002 Major League Baseball Draft but elected to return to Texas.

In 2003, Majewski earned First-Team 2003 College Baseball All-America Team All-American honors from the American Baseball Coaches Association, Baseball America and the National Collegiate Baseball Writers Association. As defending national champions, Majewski and Texas returned to the 2003 College World Series, where they were eliminated by eventual national champion Rice.

Professional career
Majewski was drafted by the Oakland Athletics in the 3rd round of the 2003 Major League Baseball Draft.

In 2004, as a member of the Kane County Cougars, Majewski was named a starter in the 2004 Midwest League All-Star Game. In 2005, Majewski was traded to the Toronto Blue Jays for Chad Gaudin. Majewski would go on to make the Florida State League All-Star Game in 2006 as a member of the Dunedin Blue Jays. Later that season, after being promoted to the New Hampshire Fisher Cats, Majewski set a club record by hitting a home run in four consecutive games. Majewski would ultimately go on to spend his last two seasons in the Texas Rangers organization, with the Frisco RoughRiders and Oklahoma City RedHawks, before retiring after the 2009 season.

See also
Rule 5 draft results

References

External links

1981 births
Living people
All-American college baseball players
American expatriate baseball players in Canada
Baseball outfielders
Baseball players from Texas
Blinn Buccaneers baseball players
Dunedin Blue Jays players
Frisco RoughRiders players
Kane County Cougars players
New Hampshire Fisher Cats players
Oklahoma City RedHawks players
People from Brenham, Texas
Stockton Ports players
Texas Longhorns baseball players
Vancouver Canadians players